Richard Neilson Lochhead (born 24 May 1969) is a Scottish politician serving as the Minister for Just Transition, Employment and Fair Work since 2021. A member of the Scottish National Party (SNP), he served as the Cabinet Secretary for Rural Affairs, Food and Environment from 2007 to 2016. Lochhead has been a member of the Scottish Parliament (MSP) since 1999, first representing North East Scotland electoral region from 1999 to 2006, before representing the Moray constituency since 2006.

A native of Paisley, Lochhead is graduate of the University of Stirling, where he studied Politics. He worked as an office manager for Alex Salmond, the Leader of the SNP at the time, from 1994 to 1998, before becoming an environmental development officer for Dundee City Council. He was elected to the inaugural Scottish Parliament in 1999, where he represented North East Scotland. In a 2006 by-election, Lochhead successfully succeeded Margaret Ewing in representing the Moray constituency, following her death. In the SNP's opposition benches, he held portfolios on Environment, Energy, Fishing and Rural Affairs. Following the appointment of Salmond as First Minister of Scotland in 2007, he appointed Lochhead as the Cabinet Secretary for Rural Affairs and the Environment. He remained as the Rural Affairs Secretary under First Minister Nicola Sturgeon, but added food policy onto his portfolio. He stood down from government before the dissolution of the 4th Scottish Parliament and sat as a backbencher. In 2018, he returned to government, this time as a junior Minister for Further Education, Higher Education and Science, before being appointed in the new post of Minister for Just Transition, Employment and Fair Work.

Early life 
Richard Neilson Lochhead was born in Paisley on  24 May 1969. He attended Williamwood High School in Clarkston and Central College of Commerce in Glasgow before he graduated in 1994 in Political Studies from the University of Stirling. He worked for the SNP leader, Alex Salmond, as his Office Manager from 1994 to 1998, before becoming an environmental development officer for Dundee City Council. He was the SNP candidate in Gordon in the 1997 UK General Election, where he finished third. He subsequently fought the Aberdeen Central constituency in both 1999 and 2003, but came second to Lewis Macdonald each time.

Political career

SNP in opposition; 1999 to 2007 
Lochhead was elected to the Scottish Parliament at the 1999 election and re-elected at the 2003 election for the North East Scotland Region. In January 2006 he was selected as the SNP candidate for Moray for the 2007 Scottish Parliament elections, following the announcement that Margaret Ewing MSP would be retiring. He beat Margaret Ewing's sister-in-law, former MP Annabelle Ewing in the selection. Ewing's premature death triggered a by-election and Lochhead resigned his additional member seat in April 2006 in order to successfully contest the Moray by-election. He was elected on 28 April 2006. This was the first time since the Second World War that an incumbent party had retained a by-election seat without losing votes or having their majority or share of the vote lowered.

He was convener of the European and External Relations Committee of the Scottish Parliament 11 June 2003 – 14 September 2004. In opposition he held the SNP's portfolios on Environment, Energy, Fishing and Rural Affairs in the Scottish Parliament.

Rural Affairs Secretary; 2007 to 2016 
After the SNP's victory at the 2007 Scottish Parliament Election, it was announced on 16 May 2007 that Lochhead would be the Cabinet Secretary for Rural Affairs and Environment, taking up the position the following day. The junior Ministerial position of Minister for the Environment was initially given to Michael Russell (currently held by Aileen McLeod). In May 2007, Lochhead started his tenure with promises to "relentlessly" pursue the Scottish fishing interests on behalf of fishermen and their communities.

Lochhead was re-elected at the 2011 election with a further increased majority of 10,944.  He announced his resignation as Environment Secretary, effective on 18 May 2016, as Nicola Sturgeon put together her reshuffle to appoint the second Sturgeon government.

Return to government; 2018 to present 
On 31 August 2018 he was announced as Minister for Further Education, Higher Education and Science.

He retained his seat at the 2021 Scottish Parliament election, with an increased majority, number of votes and percentage of votes cast. After the election, he was appointed as Minister for Just Transition, Employment and Fair Work.

Personal life
Richard Lochhead is married to Fiona, and they have two children together.

References

External links
 personal website
 
 profile on SNP website

1969 births
Living people
Scottish National Party MSPs
Alumni of the University of Stirling
Ministers of the Scottish Government
Politics of Moray
Politicians from Paisley, Renfrewshire
People educated at Williamwood High School
Members of the Scottish Parliament 1999–2003
Members of the Scottish Parliament 2003–2007
Members of the Scottish Parliament 2007–2011
Members of the Scottish Parliament 2011–2016
Members of the Scottish Parliament 2016–2021
Members of the Scottish Parliament 2021–2026